Raymond Brassier (born 1965) is a British philosopher. He is member of the philosophy faculty at the American University of Beirut, Lebanon, known for his work in philosophical realism. He was formerly Research Fellow at the Centre for Research in Modern European Philosophy at Middlesex University, London, England.

Brassier is the author of Nihil Unbound: Enlightenment and Extinction and the translator of Alain Badiou's Saint Paul: The Foundation of Universalism and Theoretical Writings and Quentin Meillassoux's After Finitude: An Essay on the Necessity of Contingency. He first attained prominence as a leading authority on the works of François Laruelle.

Brassier is of mixed French-Scottish ancestry, and his family name is pronounced in the French manner.

Education
He received a Bachelor of Arts degree from the University of North London in 1995 and Master of Arts and Doctor of Philosophy degrees from the University of Warwick in 1997 and 2001 respectively.

Philosophical work
Along with Quentin Meillassoux, Graham Harman, and Iain Hamilton Grant, Brassier is one of the foremost philosophers of contemporary speculative realism interested in providing a robust defence of philosophical realism in the wake of the challenges posed to it by post-Kantian critical idealism, phenomenology, post-modernism, deconstruction, or, more broadly speaking, what they refer to as "correlationism". Brassier is generally credited with coining the term speculative realism, though Meillassoux had earlier used the phrase speculative materialism  to refer to his own position.

Brassier himself, however, does not identify with the speculative realist movement, and, further, debates that there even is such a movement, stating:

Brassier is strongly critical of much of contemporary philosophy for what he regards as its attempt "to stave off the 'threat' of nihilism by safeguarding the experience of meaning – characterized as the defining feature of human existence – from the Enlightenment logic of disenchantment". According to Brassier, this tendency is exemplified above all by philosophers strongly influenced by Heidegger and Wittgenstein. Unlike philosophers such as John McDowell, who would press philosophy into service in an attempt to bring about a "re-enchantment of the world", Brassier's work aims to "push nihilism to its ultimate conclusion".

According to Brassier, "the disenchantment of the world understood as a consequence of the process whereby the Enlightenment shattered the 'great chain of being' and defaced the 'book of the world' is a necessary consequence of the coruscating potency of reason, and hence an invigorating vector of intellectual discovery, rather than a calamitous diminishment". "Philosophy", exhorts Brassier, "would do well to desist from issuing any further injunctions about the need to re-establish the meaningfulness of existence, the purposefulness of life, or mend the shattered concord between man and nature. It should strive to be more than a sop to the pathetic twinge of human self-esteem. Nihilism is not an existential quandary but a speculative opportunity."

Brassier's work attempts to fuse elements of post-war French philosophy with ideas arising from the (largely Anglo-American) traditions of philosophical naturalism, cognitive science, and neurophilosophy. Thus, along with French philosophers such as François Laruelle, Alain Badiou, and Quentin Meillassoux, he is also heavily influenced by the likes of Paul Churchland, Thomas Metzinger and Stephen Jay Gould. He also draws heavily, albeit often negatively, on the work of Gilles Deleuze, Edmund Husserl, and Martin Heidegger.

Brassier's work has often been associated with contemporary philosophies of nihilism and pessimism. In an interview True Detective creator and writer Nic Pizzolatto gave he cited Brassier's Nihil Unbound as an influence on the TV series, along with Thomas Ligotti's The Conspiracy Against the Human Race, Jim Crawford's Confessions of an Antinatalist, Eugene Thacker's In The Dust of This Planet, and David Benatar's Better Never to Have Been.

Bibliography
Books
Nihil Unbound: Enlightenment and Extinction (London: Palgrave Macmillan, 2007).

Book chapters

 Brassier, R. "Abolition and Aufhebung: Reply to Dimitra Kotouza" in What Is To Be Done Under Real Subsumption? (Berlin: Mute Books, 2020).
 Brassier, R. "Concrete Rules and Abstract Machines: Form and Function in A Thousand Plateaus" in A Thousand Plateaus and Philosophy (Edinburgh: Edinburgh University Press, 2018).
 Brassier, R. "Pratiques et processus: à propos du naturalisme" in Choses en soi. Métaphysique du réalisme (Paris: Presses Universitaires de France, 2018).
 Brassier, R. "The Metaphysics of Sensation: Psychological Nominalism and the Reality of Consciousness" in Wilfrid Sellars, Idealism, and Realism: Understanding Psychological Nominalism (London: Bloomsbury Academic, 2017).
 Brassier, R. "Jameson on Making History Appear" in This is the Time. This is the Record of the Time (Beirut: American University of Beirut Press, 2017).
 Brassier, R. "Correlation, Speculation and the Modal Kant-Sellars Thesis" in The Legacy of Kant in Sellars and Meillassoux: Analytic and Continental Kantianism (Oxon: Routledge, 2017).
 Brassier, R. "Transcendental Realism" in The Kantian Catastrophe? Conversations on Finitude and the Limits of Philosophy (Newcastle: Bigg Books, 2017).
 Brassier, R. "Prometheanism and its Critics" in #Accelerate: The Accelerationist Reader (Falmouth & Berlin: Urbanomic & Merve Verlag, 2014).
 Brassier, R. "Nominalism, naturalism, and materialism: Sellars’s critical ontology" in Contemporary Philosophical Naturalism and its Implications (Oxon: Routledge, 2013).
 Brassier, R. "Laruelle and the reality of abstraction" in Laruelle and Non-Philosophy (Edinburgh: Edinburgh University Press, 2012).
 Brassier, R. "Concepts, objects, gems" in Theory after 'Theory''' (New York: Routledge, 2011).
 Brassier, R. "Science" in Alain Badiou: Key Concepts (Oxon: Routledge, 2010).
 Brassier, R. and Robin, Mackay. "Nick Land: Fanged Noumena: Selected Writings 1987-2007" (Falmouth & New York: Urbanomic & Sequence Press, 2011).
 Brassier, R. "Concepts and Objects" in The Speculative Turn: Continental Realism and Materialism (Melbourne: Re-Press, 2011).
 Brassier, R. and Christian, Kerslake. "The Origins and Ends of the Mind: Philosophical Essays on Psychoanalysis" (Leuven University Press, 2007).
 Brassier, R. and Alberto, Toscano. "Aleatory Rationalism" in Alain Badiou: Theoretical Writings (New York: Continuum Press, 2004).
 Brassier, R. and Alberto, Toscano. "Alain Badiou: Theoretical Writings"  (New York: Continuum Press, 2004).

Articles
"Wandering Abstraction." Mute (2014)
 "Transcendental Logic and True Representings." Glass-bead (2016)
 "Dialectics Between Suspicion and Trust." Stasis (2017)

As translator
 Alain Badiou, Saint Paul: The Foundation of Universalism, transl. by Ray Brassier (Stanford: Stanford University Press, 2003).
 Alain Badiou, Theoretical Writings, transl. by Ray Brassier & Alberto Toscano (New York: Continuum, 2004).
 Jean-Luc Nancy, "Philosophy without Conditions," transl. by Ray Brassier, collected in Think Again: Alain Badiou and the Future of Philosophy, ed. Peter Hallward (Great Britain: MPG Books, 2004).
 Quentin Meillassoux, After Finitude: An Essay on the Necessity of Contingency'', transl. by Ray Brassier (New York: Continuum, 2008).

References

External links
 Faculty webpage at the American University of Beirut 
 Review of Nihil Unbound in New Humanist
 Axiomatic Heresy: The Non-Philosophy of Francois Laruelle Radical Philosophy 121, Sep/Oct 2003. p. 25
 Webpage for Collapse journal featuring contributions by Ray Brassier and other "speculative realists"
 Interview with Ray Brassier
 Ray Brassier interviewed by Marcin Rychter "KRONOS"
 Catherine Malabou's talk It Does Not Have to Be Like This (On Meillassoux and Contingency) from the Forum for European Philosophy at Manchester Metropolitan University, September 2012 (MP3)
 Contemporary Readings of Hegel at The New Centre for Research & Practice (YouTube)

1965 births
Living people
21st-century British philosophers
Academic staff of the American University of Beirut
Continental philosophers
French–English translators
Materialism
Metaphysicians
Philosophers of nihilism
Philosophical realism
Translators of philosophy
21st-century translators
Noise musicians
Industrial musicians
Heidegger scholars
Nihilists
Postmodernists